Desmoscolecidae is a family of nematodes belonging to the order Desmoscolecida.

Genera

Genera:
 Antarcticonema Timm, 1978
 Calligyrus Lorenzen, 1969
 Demanema Timm, 1970

References

Nematodes